Eugene Gorham Hoitt (1850–1928) was a Massachusetts surgeon and  politician who served as the sixth mayor of Marlborough, Massachusetts.

Family
Hoitt was the oldest child of the railroad engineer Samuel Locke Hoitt and Ann Jane Hadley. In 1864, his father survived the Shohola train wreck as the engineer of the Confederate prisoner's train. In 1873 Hoitt married Sarah Frances Barrett, with whom he had two daughters.

Notes

1850 births
1928 deaths
University at Buffalo alumni
Politicians from Manchester, New Hampshire
Mayors of Marlborough, Massachusetts
Massachusetts Democrats
Physicians from Massachusetts